The Aluona Hydrographical Sanctuary is a protected area of a state importance in Josvainiai Eldership of Kėdainiai District Municipality and Babtai Eldership of Kaunas District Municipality, in central Lithuania. It covers the middle and the lower course of the Aluona. The sanctuary starts in Skaistgiriai village surroundings and ends near the Aluona confluence with the Nevėžis.

The aim of the sanctuary is to protect the valley of the Aluona river with its erosive relief forms and the natural loopy course of the river.

References

Protected areas in Kėdainiai District Municipality
Protected areas in Kaunas District Municipality
1992 establishments in Lithuania